Hot Summer was a Cantopop album by Leslie Cheung released in 1988 by Hong Kong record company Cinepoly and followed on the heels of the success of Cheung's Summer Romance the year before. Like Summer Romance, the album also featured a collaboration with Japanese musicians.

Its songs were considerably popular and these included "Hot Summer",  貼身 ("Close Proximity"), 無需要太多  ("Don't Need Too Much"), 沉默是金  ("Silence is Golden"), 繼續跳舞  ("Keep on Dancing"),  and  内心爭鬥  ("Inner Struggle"). The song "Close Proximity" won the Jade Solid Gold Award in 1988 and was among the popular songs in Hong Kong for that year. Track 10 ("Love Again") is a Cantonese cover of Glenn Frey's 1982 song "The One You Love" from album No Fun Aloud.

Track listing
 "Hot Summer" - 3:57
 貼身 ("Close Proximity") - 3:13
 無需要太多 ("Don't Need Too Much") - 4:27
 可否多一吻 ("How About One More Kiss") - 5:07
 Hey！不要玩 ("Hey! Don't Play") - 3:34
 沉默是金 ("Silence is Golden") - 4:09
 繼續跳舞 ("Keep on Dancing!") - 4:26
 濃情 ("Deep Affections") - 3:33
 内心爭鬥 ("Inner Struggle") - 4:43
 再戀 ("Love Again") - 4:42

Personnel
Leslie Cheung - vocals
Ricky Chu, Nick - drums
Lam Chi Wan, Eddie Sing - bass
Hidetoshi Yamada, Tony Arevalo Jr. Andrew Tuason, Paulino Babida - keyboards
Tsuyoshi Kon, Joey, Masaki Matsubaro - guitar
Ric Halstead - saxophone

Production
Producer: Leslie Cheung, Patrick Yeung, Masa Sakuma
Recording/Mixing: Paterson Wong
Sound Engineer: Johnny Cheung, Yeung Tak Keung
Cover Design and Art: Alan Chan
Photography: Justin Chan
Co-ordinator: Hideo Takayama

Leslie Cheung albums
1988 albums
Cinepoly Records albums